Takabva Mawaya (born 2 February 1993) is a Zimbabwean footballer who plays as a goalkeeper for Bulawayo Chiefs and the Zimbabwe national football team.

Career

Club
Mawaya began his club career with Hwange Colliery, appearing for the team for several years before leaving in 2016 as part of a mass exodus from the club. He joined ZPC Kariba where he played for five years, albeit interrupted by a single season at Ngezi Platinum. In 2020, he moved to Triangle United, stating that he viewed the club as a new beginning for his career. In February 2022, he joined Bulawayo Chiefs.

International
In January 2017, Mawaya received his first call-up to the Zimbabwe national team ahead of the 2017 Africa Cup of Nations. In June, he made his senior international debut, registering a clean sheet in Zimbabwe's 6–0 victory over Seychelles during the group stages of the 2017 COSAFA Cup.

Career statistics

International

References

External links

1993 births
Living people
Zimbabwe Premier Soccer League players
Zimbabwean footballers
Zimbabwe international footballers
Association football goalkeepers
Sportspeople from Kwekwe
Ngezi Platinum F.C. players